Mangifera monandra is a species of plant in the family Anacardiaceae. It is endemic to the Philippines.  It is threatened by habitat loss.

References

Flora of the Philippines
monandra
Endangered plants
Taxonomy articles created by Polbot
Taxa named by Elmer Drew Merrill